Branch Mouth is a village in the Cayo District of	central interior Belize. It is situated north of San Ignacio and named for its placement near the confluence of the Macal and Mopan Rivers where the Belize River is formed. The village is in an agricultural region with the most frequent crops being citrus and banana.	It is one of 192 municipalities administrated at the village level in the country for census taking purposes.	The village had a population of	127	in 2010. This represents roughly 0.2% of the district's total population. This was a	53.80% decrease from 275 people recorded in the 2000 census.

References 

Populated places in Cayo District